Hen Cliff is part of the Jurassic Coast near Kimmeridge in the Isle of Purbeck, Dorset, England.

The cliff runs from the eastern end of Kimmeridge Bay (below the folly called Clavell Tower) east to an area called Cuddle. The cliffs consist (as at Kimmeridge Bay) of ledges of dolomite interspersed with thicker units of shale. Rockfalls are common and dangerous here. To the southeast are the Kimmeridge Ledges.

References

Isle of Purbeck
Cliffs of England
Headlands of Dorset
Jurassic Coast